Giovanni Domenico Ferretti (Giandomenico), also called Giandomenico d'Imola (15 June 1692 – 18 August 1768) was an Italian Rococo style painter from Florence. According to the contemporary Giovanni Camillo Sagrestani, Ferretti was a pupil of the Bolognese painter Giuseppe Maria Crespi. Others say he worked with painter Giovanni Gioseffo dal Sole.

He returned to Florence with a letter of recommendation of Cardinal Gozzadini seeking patronage from Cosimo III de' Medici. He found work in the studio of Tommaso Redi and Sebastiano Galeotti. He travelled to Bologna to work under Felice Torelli and then resettled in Florence in 1715. Ferretti soon joined the Florentine Accademia del Disegno, where he later taught painting but also designed tapestries for the Medici. He found abundant patronage in fresco painting for the Florentine Abbey (Badia Fiorentina), the Chapel of San Giuseppe in the Duomo, and the altar and cupola of the Church of San Salvatore al Vescovo. One of his most important works was the decoration of the ceiling of the Church of Santa Maria del Carmine, since lost in a fire.

Ferretti's fresco style was influenced by Sebastiano Ricci's lively, colourful, and pastel-hued frescoes in the Palazzo Marucelli-Fenzi. Ferretti himself decorated the Palazzo Amati Cellesi in  Pistoia, the Palazzo Sansedoni in Siena, and the Villa Flori in Pescia. The frescoes for the cupola of the cathedral of San Zeno in Pistoia are attributed to him.

References

Footnotes

External links

Web Gallery of Art Biography
 Getty Museum Biography

1692 births
1768 deaths
17th-century Italian painters
Italian male painters
18th-century Italian painters
Painters from Florence
Italian Baroque painters
Rococo painters
Tapestry artists
Italian textile artists
18th-century Italian male artists